Arno Rossman (born 1954) is an Estonian politician. He was a member of X Riigikogu.

Prior to becoming an alternate member of the Riigikogu, Rossman was the Mayor of Kohtla Parish.

References

Living people
1954 births
People's Union of Estonia politicians
Members of the Riigikogu, 2003–2007
Mayors of places in Estonia
Place of birth missing (living people)
Date of birth missing (living people)